Sugar Creek or Sugarcreek may refer to:

Communities in the United States
 Sugar Creek, Indiana, a town
 Sugar Creek, Missouri, a city
 Sugarcreek, Ohio, a village
 Sugarcreek, Pennsylvania, a borough
 Sugar Creek (Texas), a subdivision in Fort Bend County, Texas
 Sugar Creek, Wisconsin, a town
 Sugar Creek Township (disambiguation)

Waterways

United States

Georgia
 Sugar Creek (Toccoa River tributary)
 Sugar Creek (Ocmulgee River tributary)

Illinois
 Sugar Creek (Sangamon River tributary)

Indiana
 Sugar Creek (Wabash River tributary)
 Sugar Creek (Driftwood River tributary)

Minnesota
 Sugar Creek (Minnesota)

Missouri
 Sugar Creek (Grand River)
 Sugar Creek (Honey Creek)
 Sugar Creek (Missouri River)
 Sugar Creek (Perche Creek)
 Sugar Creek (Salt River)
 Sugar Creek (Mississippi River)
 Sugar Creek (Thompson River)
 Sugar Creek (Wyaconda River)

New York
 Sugar Creek (Keuka Lake)

North Carolina
 Sugar Creek (North Carolina)

Ohio
 Sugar Creek (Little Miami River tributary)
 Sugar Creek (Ottawa River tributary)
 Sugar Creek (Tuscarawas River tributary)

Oklahoma
 Sugar Creek (Caddo County, Oklahoma)

Pennsylvania
 Sugar Creek (Susquehanna River tributary)
 Sugar Creek (French Creek tributary)

Tennessee
 Sugar Creek (Duck River) tributary

West Virginia
 Sugar Creek (Middle Island Creek tributary)
 Sugar Creek (Laurel Creek tributary)

Australia
 Sugar Creek (New South Wales), a tributary of the Wallingat River

Other uses
 Sugar Creek (film), a 2007 supernatural western thriller

See also
 
 
 Big Sugar Creek, in Missouri
 Little Sugar Creek in Arkansas and Missouri
 Sugar Run Creek, a tributary of the Susquehanna River in Pennsylvania
 Sugar River (disambiguation)